Happy Tree Friends is an adult animated television series that was broadcast from September 25 to December 25, 2006 on G4 in the United States. With a total of thirteen episodes that were aired, the show is based on the web series of the same name, created and developed by Aubrey Ankrum, Rhode Montijo, Kenn Navarro, and Warren Graff for Mondo Media. The series was animated by Canadian studio Fatkat, while the opening and end credits were produced by Ghostbot.

The series is a juxtaposition of cute cartoon anthropomorphic forest animals, who are suddenly subjected to extreme graphic violence. Each episode revolves around the characters enduring accidental or deliberately inflicted pain or mutilation.

Cast
 Kenn Navarro as Cuddles, Flippy, Lifty and Shifty 
 Ellen Connell as Giggles, Petunia, and Cub
 Warren Graff as Toothy and Handy
 David Winn as Lumpy and Splendid
 Michael Lipman as Nutty
 Liz Stuart as Sniffles
 Aubrey Ankrum as Pop and Fliqpy
 Nica Lorber as Flaky
 Peter Hermann as Disco Bear
 Francis Carr as Russell
 Sarah Castelblanco as Mime (audible noises only)

Episodes

International broadcast
In Canada, Razer aired the show in syndication with then-sibling television system Citytv.

The series has also been broadcast on MTV in Europe and Latin America, and on Animax in South Africa.

Notes

References

2000s American adult animated television series
2006 American television series debuts
2006 American television series endings
2000s Canadian adult animated television series
2006 Canadian television series debuts
2006 Canadian television series endings
G4 (American TV network) original programming
Happy Tree Friends
English-language television shows
American adult animated comedy television series
Canadian adult animated comedy television series